This page details football records in the Czech Republic.

Team records

Most championships won

Overall
 11, Sparta Prague (1993–94, 1994–95, 1996–97, 1997–98, 1998–99, 1999–00, 2000–01, 2002–03, 2004–05, 2006–07, 2009–10)

Consecutives
 5, Sparta Prague (1996–97, 1997–98, 1998–99, 1999–00, 2000–01)

Most seasons in Czech First League

 27, Slavia Prague
 27, Slovan Liberec
 27, Sparta Prague

Most games won
499,  Sparta Prague

Most games drawn
227, Banik Ostrava

Most games lost
292, Zbrojovka Brno

Individual records

League Appearances
Including appearances in the Czechoslovak era
465, Jaroslav Šilhavý

Czech First League (since 1993)
Source:
436, Stanislav Vlček
432, Martin Vaniak
432, Rudolf Otepka
426, Pavel Horváth
418, David Lafata

League Goalscorers

198, David Lafata

Czech First League (since 1993)
Source:
198, David Lafata
134, Horst Siegl
125, Libor Došek
94, Milan Škoda
94, Stanislav Vlček
92, Luděk Zelenka

Attendance records

Top 10 Highest Attendances
The top ten highest league attendances have all been at Stadion Za Lužánkami in Brno.

Total Titles Won

References

External links
Official Gambrinus liga website

Records
Czech Republic